Pak Il-u (1903–1955) was a Korean independence activist and a politician. Following the formal establishment of the Democratic People's Republic of Korea, he was the first Minister of Interior in the North Korean Cabinet.

Biography
Born in Hoeryong, North Hamgyeong Province, he moved to Manchuria as a child, graduated from Yongjeong, Gil-hyeon, Jilin Province, and served as a teacher. He entered the Chinese pavilion and joined the Chinese Communist Party. After the Sino-Japanese War, he worked as an on-site in the medical examination area (晉察冀 邊區, local government of China). After the July 7th Incident, he joined the first guerrilla detachment in Pingxi in the winter of 1937. In January 1938, he went to the Jinchaji Military Region. He served as an instructor at the Coastal Military Administration University, and in July of the same year, he was appointed deputy commander of the Korea Medical School and launched an anti-Japanese struggle. In July 1942, he went to the Taihang Mountain Anti-Japanese Revolutionary Base to participate in the establishment of the Korean Independent League and the Korean Volunteer Army. He served as a standing member of the Central Committee of the Korean Independent League and a deputy commander of the Korean Volunteer Army. After entering Korea in November 1945, he was active in political matters. In August 1946 he became senior Member of the Central Committee of the North Korean Workers' Party, February 1947 he was appointed director of the Interior of the People's Committee of North Korea. In March 1948 he became a member of the Central Committee of the North Korean Workers' Party.

North Korea
Following the formal declaration on the establishment of the Democratic People's Republic of Korea he was elected to the first convocation of the Supreme People's Assembly and was appointed to the first Minister of Interior in the North Korean Cabinet led by Premier Kim Il-sung until 1953 and was awarded the rank of lieutenant general. In June 1949 he became member of the Democratic Front for the Reunification of Korea, in June 1950 he became a member of the Military Committee, On November that year Vice Commander of the Front Command, Minister of Political Security in July 1951. In November 1950, he served as deputy commander of the Korean People's Army Frontline Command (1950.11-1952.2). In December, he served as deputy political member of the Joint Command of the Chinese People's Volunteers and the Korean People's Army. In 1951, Kim Il-sung dismissed Mu Chong the most powerful figure in the Yan'an faction, the deputy minister of the Ministry of National Defense and the artillery commander of the Korean People's Army, on the grounds of "lost Pyongyang" and "weak combat". Pak Il-u who was the internal affairs minister considered to be a personal representative of Mao Zedong, was replaced by Choe Yong-gon in the post of deputy political commissar of the Joint Command of the Chinese and Korean Army in February 1953. In March of the same year, when the North Korean cabinet was re-elected, he was removed from the position as Minister of Interior and appointed to the Minister of Communications, until November 1955 when he was purged and executed.

References

Government ministers of North Korea
Korean communists
1903 births
1955 deaths
Members of the 1st Central Committee of the Workers' Party of North Korea
Members of the 2nd Central Committee of the Workers' Party of Korea
Members of the 2nd Political Committee of the Workers' Party of Korea
Members of the 2nd Standing Committee of the Workers' Party of Korea
Members of the 1st Supreme People's Assembly
Korean independence activists